Thrikkunnapuzha is a village near Harippad in Alappuzha district in the Indian state of Kerala.

Thrikkunnapuzha is the south-west part of Alappuzha district, Kerala, India. Renowned as Sreemoolavasam, this coastal area found in the Kerala history. Thrikkunnapuzha is one of the gateway to the inland water ways of Alappey. This place, where narrow canals, rivers, lakes lagoons and land meet are aptly called "backwaters". It is the land of fishermen. It is known for its Ayyappa Swami Temple. National Waterway 3 passes through the place. Kumaran Asan, the Malayalam poet, died in a boat accident at Pallanayar in Kumarakodi of Thrikkunnappuzha.

The only Pentecostal Church is belongs Assemblies of God Malayalam District Council. Assembly of God Revival Centre also situated here.
Rev Royson Johni from Kulathupuzha built the Church here.

Thrikkunnapuzha beach is known for Karkidaka vavu or "Karkidaka Vavu Bali". The beach of Thrikkunnapuzha is rich in mineral sand called black sand. “Thrkkunnappuzha Sri DharmaSastha Temple” is one of the temples in Alappuzha District

History

Thrikkunnapuzha is the south-west part of Alappuzha district. Renowned as Sreemoolavasam, this coastal area found in the Kerala history. An ancient port city and a busy port is believed to have been flourishing there in the ancient days. Some ancient manuscript reveals that this port city situated 5–6 km away from the present Sastha Temple which is now eroded by the sea. Well-known historian Sree Ilamkulam Kunjan Pillai in his book ‘keralolpathi’ described this place. The Chinese explorer Huan Sang gives a note that, among the inhabitants here the ‘Pali aryas’ were dominant and they established a monastery with holy idols of SreeBudha. The ancient Sreemoola vasa nagaram was destroyed by the huge tidal waves from the Arabian Sea.

Yet another story is in vogue about the existence of the old city. Parasurama the sixth incarnation of lord Mahavishnu, as he ventured to take vengeance against all the kshatriyas here was not fortunate enough to keep away from the anger of Parasurama. He killed them one by one and invaded their domains. Later he decided to divide the place in to 64 parts and give it to Brahmins. One among the 64 part was Sreemoolavasam or Sreemoolapadam. As his mind filled with sorrow that he had killed thousands of innocent people he decided to confess. He set up 64 temples and placed it with idols of Lord Siva, Lord Vishnu, and Lord Sasthav. After centuries the temple was eroded by the tidal waves. As the sea receded the idol of Sastha and debris of the temple were recovered and was believed to have been  kept by the residents.

Hundreds of years ago Keralam  had been ruled by the emperor ‘Cheraman  Perumal’. He established places at Thrikkakkara, Kodungallur, and Kollam for administrative purpose, and deputed his representatives there. As he was an ardent follower of Lord Budha he decided to divide the dynasty among his sons and went for a holy journey. As he was traveling with his  servants and Budha monks through Ashtamudi  kayal and Kayamkulam kayal, he happened to see a river flowing to north. He continued to travel through the river. After traveling more, he stopped his boat and decided to take rest. People in large number crowded there to see Perumal and tell there grievance. They brought to notice the Sastha idol which they got from sea and the debris of the ancient temple. Acknowledging their request Perumal built a new temple and sanctified the idol of Sastha there. ‘Thirukkonna puzha’ called by Perumal was unified to ‘Thrikkunnapuzha’ as year passed, and the temple was known as ‘Thrikkunnapuzha Sri Dharma Sastha Temple’. It was nearly 3 km to the west of the present temple.

Attraction
 
 Karrkidaka Vaavu Bali (Keralite tribute ceremony for ancestors)
 Thrikkunnapuzha Sree Dharmasastha Temple
 Pathiyankara Juma Masjid
 Muhiyudheen Juma MAsjid
 Coir Village Lake Resort
 Mahakavi Kumaranasan's tomb, Kumarakodi
 Boat Races
 Backwater cruise
 Thrikkunnapuzha Beach
 Toddy Shops

References

External links
 

Villages in Alappuzha district